Anastasiya Shlapakova (born 6 March 2000) is a Belarusian footballer who plays as a midfielder for Premier League club FC Dinamo Minsk and the Belarus women's national team.

Career
Shlapakova has been capped for the Belarus national team, appearing for the team during the 2019 FIFA Women's World Cup qualifying cycle.

International goals

References

External links
 
 
 

2000 births
Living people
Women's association football midfielders
Belarusian women's footballers
People from Myadzyel District
Belarus women's international footballers
Sportspeople from Minsk Region